Lawrence James Benton (November 20, 1897 – April 3, 1953) was an American right-handed pitcher in Major League Baseball who played for the Boston Braves, New York Giants and Cincinnati Reds over parts of thirteen seasons from 1923 to 1935. He was the National League wins leader while pitching for the Giants in 1928, compiling a 128–128 career record with a 4.03 ERA and 670 strikeouts in 455 appearances.

Benton is buried at Old St. Joseph's Cemetery in Cincinnati.

See also
 List of Major League Baseball annual wins leaders

References

External links

1897 births
1953 deaths
Baltimore Orioles (IL) players
Baseball players from St. Louis
Boston Braves players
Burials at Old St. Joseph's Cemetery
Cincinnati Reds players
Major League Baseball pitchers
Memphis Chickasaws players
National League wins champions
New York Giants (NL) players
Portsmouth Truckers players